Pachygaster atra, the dark-winged black, is a European species of soldier fly.

Description
A minute (body length 2–3 mm.) lustrous black fly with a round abdomen  Body length 2–3 mm. Brilliant black. Eyes black and green. Proboscis brown. Antennae brown (male), red (apical half slightly yellow in female). Halteres brown.

Biology
The habitat is deciduous woodland, on tree leaves, and bark (Linden, pine, alder, poplar), on hedge foliage. Larvae have been found in decomposed elm wood, garden compost heaps, decaying vegetation and leaf litter. The flight period is from June to August.

Distribution
Central and South European Russia, Caucasus. West Europe. Common.

References

External links
Images representing Pachygaster atra at Bold

Stratiomyidae
Diptera of Europe
Insects described in 1798